Djurgårdens Idrottsförening, commonly known simply as Djurgårdens IF, Djurgården, and (especially locally) Djurgår'n, Dif or DIF  – is a Swedish sports association with several sections, located in Stockholm.

Name
The club is named after the City Park and borough Djurgården, which originally was a royal hunting park. A direct translation of Djurgården would be “the animal garden” or "the animal yard". The word djur means "animal" but has the same etymology as the word “deer”, meaning "deer garden" may have been its original meaning.

History
The club was founded in 1891 by a group of young athletes living in the borough and port district Djurgårdsstaden on Djurgården in central Stockholm. Most of the founders were from the shipping industry working class, and Djurgården maintained that profile for most of its early history, in sharp contrast with middle class rivals AIK. With an original focus on winter sports and athletics, the club quickly branched into other sports, becoming one of Sweden's most successful sports clubs of the 20th and 21st century. The club started playing association football in 1899 and soon started a derby rivalry with neighbouring club AIK, the so-called tvillingderbyt.

Today the most popular sections are ice hockey and football, with 16 and 12 Swedish national championship titles respectively. Other popular sections are bandy, handball and floorball. The club has won 466 Swedish championships through 2022, with this Djurgården is the most successful sports club in Sweden, it is also more championship titles than the two main rivals AIK and Hammarby have together.

Emblem and colours
The first emblem of the club was a four-pointed silver star in saltire, which had a shield on it with the letters DIF. This star pre-dates the similar star which Idrottsföreningen Kamraterna adopted and is using to this day. The present emblem, in the form of a shield in yellow, red and blue with the text D.I.F. was adopted in 1896. According to an often-quoted poem by Johan af Klercker from 1908, blue and yellow stand for Sweden and red stands for love. Blue and yellow are also the colours of Stockholm and yellow, red and blue are the colors of the arms of Stockholm County. 

Yellow, red and blue are the club colours. The logo is registered as a trademark and the colours are set to Pantone, CMYK and web colour values. In many sports – among them football, bandy and handball – the home jersey of the team is vertically striped in light and dark blue. Because of this, blue is usually seen as the most important of the three colours. The ice hockey team uses jerseys in one blue shade with yellow and red details.

Sections

Djurgårdens IF has a number of member sections, all of which legally are their own associations with their own financial and sporting responsibilities but share the common name, logo and values and support each other.

Major sections
 Djurgårdens IF Fotboll – football (men)
 Djurgårdens IF Hockey – ice hockey (men)
 Djurgårdens IF Hockey (women) – ice hockey (women)

Other sections
 Djurgårdens IF Alpint – alpine skiing
 Djurgårdens IF Amerikansk fotboll – American football
 Djurgårdens IF Bandy – bandy
 Djurgårdens IF Basket – basketball
 Djurgårdens IF Beachsoccer – beach soccer (men)
 Djurgårdens IF Beachsoccer Dam – beach soccer (women)
 Djurgårdens IF Bordtennisförening – table tennis
 Djurgårdens IF Boule – boule
 Djurgårdens IF Bowling – bowling
 Djurgårdens IF Boxningsförening – boxing
 Djurgårdens IF Brottningsförening – wrestling
 Djurgårdens IF Cricket – cricket
 Djurgårdens IF Fotboll Dam – women's football
 Djurgårdens IF Fäktförening – fencing
 Djurgårdens IF Friidrott – athletics
 Djurgårdens IF Futsal – futsal
 Djurgårdens IF Golfförening – golf
 Djurgårdens IF Handboll – handball
 Djurgårdens IF Handikappfotboll – handicap football
 Djurgårdens IF Innebandy – floorball
 Djurgårdens IF Konståkningsförening – figure skating
 Djurgårdens IF Orienteringsförening – orienteering

Former sections
Previously, Djurgårdens IF had sections in other sports. One of these was ski jumping and DIF was one of the best clubs in Sweden in this sport for fifty years.

Fans and fan culture
Djurgården is one of the most supported clubs in Sweden, with most of its supporters living in Stockholm and the neighbouring suburbs. While other Stockholm clubs have profiled themselves as belonging to a certain borough of Stockholm, Djurgården is seen as more of a pan-Stockholm club. No reliable research exists about the spread of Djurgården supporters, but a 2015 T-shirt campaign suggests that supporters are spread fairly evenly throughout the Stockholm area.

In 1981 the main supporter club "Blue Saints" was formed, but due to its notorious fans and their bad reputation, the supporter club changed its name to Järnkaminerna, literally "The Iron Furnaces" (an old nickname for Djurgården athletes from the 1950s).  Since 2005, Fabriken is Djurgården's TIFO group; they have two ultras groups: UCS (Ultra caos Stockholm) and Ultras Sthlm.

Djurgården is probably one of a few clubs in the world who is represented both in space (by Christer Fuglesang) and in the Himalayas (by Raul Helander).

Through the years, many types of souvenirs and memorabilia has been made for the club.  Stuffed toys in the form of a rabbit called Järnkanin ("Iron Rabbit") are sold, the name a pun on the word Järnkamin.

Club beers 
A couple of beers have been created over the years.  At present, Alberget 4A is sold for Djurgårdens IF.  It is named for the address of the café where the club was founded.  The beer was launched in 2013 and is sold through Djurgårdshjälpen, a supporter initiative to raise money for the sports club.  Originally, the beer was called Alltid oavsett ("always, no matter what"), which is a slogan often used by supporters of Djurgårdens IF.  The beer is a pale lager of 5.0% abv made by Grebbestad Bryggeri on behalf of Djurgårdshjälpen and is not part of Grebbestad Bryggeri's own range of beers.

Famous Djurgården supporters
His Majesty Carl XVI Gustaf, King of Sweden
Fredrik Reinfeldt, former Prime Minister of Sweden
Olof Palme, former Prime Minister of Sweden
Lars Ohly, former party leader of Vänsterpartiet
Joakim Thåström, musician 
Stefan Persson, former CEO of H&M
Carl-Henric Svanberg, business leader
Loa Falkman, opera singer
Christer Fuglesang, astronaut, first Scandinavian in space
Martin Soneby, Swedish comedian
Veronica Maggio 
Robin Söderling
Magnus Uggla
Felix Herngren

Organisations in close cooperation
The following non-profit organisations are independent but has a close official cooperation with Djurgårdens IF:
DIF Supporters Club (stipends for young and promising athletes etc.)
Sällskapet Gamla Djurgårdare
Djurgårdsandan (club values)
DIF-arkivet (maintaining club history)

Note

References

External links 
 
Official supporter organisation website

 
Sports teams in Sweden
Multi-sport clubs in Sweden
Sports clubs established in 1891
1891 establishments in Sweden

it:Djurgårdens Idrottsförening Fotboll